Arm Share is a Thai variety web series produced by GMMTV. It is hosted by Weerayut Chansook (Arm), it is currently available for streaming on YouTube and LINE TV.

Synopsis
Each episode, Arm, along with his guests fellow juniors and senior actors from GMMTV, will offer their viewers different variety of contents  like challenges and games, sharing tips and personal cares, house visit, sharing life events, promoting different kind of products, food trip, travel and other things.

The series premiered on 16 April 2019 and currently airs every other Wednesday of the month.

Episodes

References

External links 
 Youtube Playlist 
 GMMTV

2019 web series debuts
2010s YouTube series
2020s YouTube series
Thai web series
GMMTV